The Red Hare or Chi Tu was a famous horse owned by the warlord Lü Bu, who lived during the late Eastern Han dynasty of China.

In historical records
The Red Hare was mentioned in Lü Bu's biographies in the historical texts Records of the Three Kingdoms and Book of the Later Han. It was described as very powerful, and capable of "galloping across cities and leaping over moats". Lü Bu rode this horse in 193 during a battle in Changshan (around present-day Shijiazhuang, Hebei), in which he helped another warlord Yuan Shao defeat his rival Zhang Yan.

The Cao Man Zhuan recorded that there was a saying at the time to describe Lü Bu and his Red Hare: "Among men, Lü Bu; Among steeds, Chì Tù (the Red Hare)".

In Romance of the Three Kingdoms

The Red Hare has a more prominent role in the 14th-century historical novel Romance of the Three Kingdoms, which romanticises the historical events before and during the Three Kingdoms period. It is originally a prized steed of the warlord Dong Zhuo. After hearing a suggestion from his adviser Li Su, Dong Zhuo sends Li Su to present the Red Hare as a gift to Lü Bu and induce Lü Bu to betray his foster father, Ding Yuan, and defect to his side. Lü Bu is very pleased to receive the Red Hare. After Li Su convinces him to do so, he murders Ding Yuan and defects to Dong Zhuo, whom he pledges allegiance to and acknowledges as his new foster father.

The Red Hare is described in the novel as follows: 

After Lü Bu's downfall and death at the Battle of Xiapi, the Red Hare comes into the possession of the warlord Cao Cao. Cao Cao gives it to Guan Yu later in an attempt to influence Guan Yu to join him. After Guan Yu's death, Ma Zhong (馬忠) takes the Red Hare and presents it to his lord Sun Quan, who immediately gifts the horse to Ma Zhong. The Red Hare starves itself for days and dies.

See also
 List of historical horses

References

 Chen, Shou (3rd century). Records of the Three Kingdoms (Sanguozhi).
 Fan, Ye (5th century). Book of the Later Han (Houhanshu).
 Luo, Guanzhong (14th century). Romance of the Three Kingdoms (Sanguo Yanyi).
 Pei, Songzhi (5th century). Annotations to Records of the Three Kingdoms (Sanguozhi zhu).

Individual warhorses
Three Kingdoms literature
Individual animals in China
Guan Yu